24988 Alainmilsztajn, provisional designation , is a background asteroid from the inner regions of the asteroid belt, approximately 2.5 kilometers in diameter. It was discovered on 19 June 1998, by the OCA–DLR Asteroid Survey at CERGA, Caussols, in southeastern France. The asteroid was named after French particle physicist Alain Milsztajn.

Orbit and classification 

Alainmilsztajn is a non-family from the main belt's background population. It orbits the Sun in the inner asteroid belt at a distance of 2.1–2.7 AU once every 3 years and 9 months (1,363 days). Its orbit has an eccentricity of 0.14 and an inclination of 5° with respect to the ecliptic.

The asteroid's observation arc begins 3 years prior to its official discovery observation, with a precovery taken by the Steward Observatory's Spacewatch survey at Kitt Peakt in October 1995.

Physical characteristics

Diameter and albedo 

According to the survey carried out by NASA's Wide-field Infrared Survey Explorer with its subsequent NEOWISE mission, Alainmilsztajn measures 2.2 kilometers in diameter and its surface has an exceptionally high albedo of 0.42, while the Collaborative Asteroid Lightcurve Link assumes a standard albedo for stony asteroids of 0.20 and calculates a diameter of 2.5 kilometers with an absolute magnitude of 15.34.

Rotation period 

In October 2010, a rotational lightcurve of Alainmilsztajn was obtained from photometric observations made by astronomers at the Palomar Transient Factory in California. The fragmentary lightcurve gave a rotation period of  hours with a brightness amplitude of 0.09 magnitude.

Naming 

This minor planet was named in memory of French particle physicist and astronomer Alain Milsztajn (1955–2007). His research included the structure of the proton and the quest of detecting dark matter by means of gravitational lensing. The approved naming citation was published by the Minor Planet Center on 19 August 2008.

References

External links 
 Asteroid Lightcurve Database (LCDB), query form (info )
 Dictionary of Minor Planet Names, Google books
 Asteroids and comets rotation curves, CdR – Observatoire de Genève, Raoul Behrend
 Discovery Circumstances: Numbered Minor Planets (1)-(5000) – Minor Planet Center
 
 

024988
024988
Named minor planets
19980619